Kevon André Samuels (born August 13, 1992), better known by his stage name The 6th Letter, is a Canadian hip hop recording artist from Toronto. He is a member of the hip hop collective Bakers Club.

Life and career

Early life and musical beginnings
Kevon was born on August 13, 1992, in Toronto, Ontario. He spent an early portion of his life traveling back and forth between the Flatbush section of Brooklyn, New York City where he would stay with his father (Paul McLawrence) and Downtown Toronto where he would stay with his mother (Claudette Samuels). He attended St. Mary's Catholic Secondary School in Toronto before dropping out in 2010 to pursue a career in music. Kevon adopted the moniker The 6th Letter from the nickname Freshie which was given to him in high school.

2010–2011: What The F & Go Green
In 2010, 6th released his debut mixtape titled What The F.

Discography

Mixtapes
 What The F (2010)
 Go Green (2011)
 NorthernPlayalisticGetHighMuzik (2014)
 ConeMan (2021)

References

External links
Official website

1992 births
Living people
21st-century Canadian male musicians
21st-century Canadian rappers
Black Canadian musicians
Canadian hip hop singers
Canadian male rappers
Rappers from Toronto